Gabi ng Parangal may refer to the awarding ceremony of:

Metro Manila Film Festival
FAMAS Award